Peha, formerly known as Peha & Karmen Pál-Baláž was a Slovak band originating from Prešov, Slovakia. It won a 2006 Aurel Award for Best Song with the number-one hit "Spomal".

History 
Peha was formed in 1997 when former members of IMT Smile band Katarína Knechtová and Martin Migaš joined with the members of 67th Harlem band. In 2008, Knechtová left the band and started her solo career. Peha was recreated in 2018 when the former members started working with the finalist of SuperStar 2018, Karmen Pál-Baláž. The name of the band was changed from Peha to Peha & Karmen Pál-Baláž. By 2019, Peha and Karmen Pál-Baláž no longer worked together.

Discography 
 Niečo sa chystá - , CD (1999)
 Krajinou - Sony Music/Bonton, CD (2001)
 Experiment - Sony Music/Bonton, CD (2003)
 Deň medzi nedeľou a pondelkom - B&N Music, CD (2005)
 Best Of - Sony BMG, CD (2006)

References 

Slovak musical groups
1997 establishments in Slovakia
Musical groups established in 1997